Green Park railway station is a former railway station in Bath, Somerset, England. For most of its life, it was known as Bath Queen Square.

Architecture and opening
Green Park station was opened in 1870 as the terminus of Midland Railway's Mangotsfield and Bath Branch Line. The station buildings were designed by the Midland Railway architect John Holloway Sanders.

It was built in an elegant style which blends well with the Georgian buildings around it and includes a vaulted glass roof in a single-span wrought iron arch structure.

The platform accommodation in the station was modest, having an arrival platform and a departure platform, with two sidings between them. The siding adjacent to the arrival platform was equipped with ground frame points to release an arriving train engine.

The station is on the north bank of the River Avon. The locomotive shed was about half a mile from the station to the north side of the main tracks. The goods yard was on the opposite side of the tracks from this. Access to the goods yard from central Bath was via the newly constructed Midland Bridge.

The Midland Railway's Bath branch had opened in 1869, but the river Avon bridge and the new station were not ready, so for a year the terminus was at a temporary station to the west of the river.

The Avon Bridge
Immediately outside the station, trains crossed a bridge over the Avon.  This bridge is a Town truss, a design patented by the American architect Ithiel Town in 1820 with the aim of reducing the labour costs in constructing timber bridges.  From the late 1840s the design was adapted in Britain for construction in wrought iron, and the Avon Bridge is a fine surviving example.  Since closure of the railway, the bridge has been adapted to provide vehicular and pedestrian access to Sainsbury's supermarket.

The Somerset & Dorset Railway
When the Somerset and Dorset Railway completed its Bath extension line in 1874, they connected into the Midland line at Bath Junction a half mile outside the station, and in friendly co-operation with the Midland company they used the station. This created considerable additional through traffic, and as well as heavy volumes of freight, through passenger journeys from the Midlands to the South Coast were created. Through trains had to reverse at Bath, and the most famous of these was the named Pines Express from Manchester (and at times other northern originating points) to Bournemouth West.

Motive power depots

Both the Midland Railway and the Somerset and Dorset Joint Railway opened locomotive depots near the station on the west side of the river Avon. The Midland Depot opened in 1869 and the SDJR in 1874. Both closed in March 1966.

Subsequent history

It was operated by the Midland Railway. At the grouping it passed to the London, Midland and Scottish Railway. For almost all of its life, it was usually referred to as Bath Queen Square station, after the prestigious square about a quarter of a mile away. It became Bath Green Park under British Railways in 1951.

Parts of the distinctive glass roof were damaged during bombing raids in April 1942, and the glazing was not re-instated during railway usage after the war.

The atmosphere of the station was always powerfully nostalgic, and at most times of the day a short local train could be seen simmering in the platform waiting for departure time. On summer Saturdays the station became very busy, passing numerous holiday trains between northern towns and Bournemouth; all of them had to be reversed in the station.

Ordinary services were local Midland trains to Bristol St Philips and Clifton Down, later to Bristol Temple Meads, and S&D trains to Templecombe and beyond.

Stationmasters

S. Halford 1870 - 1873
C.W. Radway 1873 - 1876 
H. Martin 1877 - 1883
James W. Yaxley 1883 - 1900
H.L. Bailey 1900 - 1908 (afterwards station master at Gloucester)
James Perry 1908 - 1922
J. Davies 1922 - 1927 (formerly station master at Bulwell, afterwards station master at Gloucester)
A. Exton 1927 - 1936
Arthur Jones 1936 - 1942 (formerly station master at Clitheroe) 
F.C. Cooper 1942 - 1953 (formerly station master at Harpenden)

Closure
Following the Beeching Report, passenger trains ceased from 1966 and the last goods train ran in 1971. In the 1980s the rail approaches to the station were redeveloped as a major supermarket opened in December 1982 and the station itself is used as a pedestrian passageway to and from the city; there are small shops in the former station buildings.

Current uses
 
A Grade II listed building, Green Park Station has become an active retail and events space.

Run for many years by Envolve Partnership, a local sustainability enterprise, The Ethical Property Company took over management in November 2008, and now manage all activity on the site, beyond the car park and the Sainsbury's supermarket. The former booking hall is now Green Park Brasserie. Since September 2019, the upstairs function rooms have been used every Sunday evening by Bath Vineyard Church for services. The old station concourses are used as a covered market and events space, with a farmers' market, and other regular Saturday traders operating in the market square. Local events and performances are scheduled throughout the year as well, and have included performances for the Bath Fringe Festival. Green Park Station also includes office space in the converted vaults of the station's lower floor, now the base to several local charities and social businesses.

Since the early months of 2021, significant parts of the station have been cordoned off to allow restorative works to take place on the roof. During and before these works took place, large glass panels came loose from the main structure, falling to the floor below. These repairs are scheduled to finish for summer 2022.

Services

See also 
 List of lattice truss bridges in the United Kingdom

References
 Butt, R.V.J. (1995). The Directory of Railway Stations. Sparkford: Patrick Stephens Limited. .

External links
Green Park Station
 Station on navigable O.S. map

Disused railway stations in Bath, Somerset
Former Midland Railway stations
Former Somerset and Dorset Joint Railway stations
History of Bath, Somerset
Grade II listed buildings in Bath, Somerset
Railway stations in Great Britain opened in 1870
Railway stations in Great Britain closed in 1966
Grade II listed railway stations
Beeching closures in England